The 2021 UTEP Miners football team represented the University of Texas at El Paso in the 2021 NCAA Division I FBS football season. The Miners were led by fourth–year head coach Dana Dimel and played their home games at the Sun Bowl. They competed as members of the West Division of Conference USA (C–USA). For the first time since 2014, the Miners became bowl eligible.

Previous season

The Miners finished the 2020 regular season 3–5 and 0–4 in C–USA play to finish in last (seventh) in the West Division. They were not invited to play in any post season bowl game. At the end of the season, the offensive and defensive coordinators were released from their duties.

Schedule
UTEP announced its 2021 football schedule on January 27, 2021. The 2021 schedule consisted of 6 home and 6 away games in the regular season.

Note: With the COVID-19 pandemic still ongoing, opponents and dates are subject to change.

Schedule Source:

Game summaries

at New Mexico State

Bethune–Cookman

at Boise State

New Mexico

Old Dominion

at Southern Miss

Louisiana Tech

at Florida Atlantic

UTSA

at North Texas

Rice

at UAB

References

UTEP
UTEP Miners football seasons
UTEP Miners football